Barley water is a traditional drink consumed in various parts of the world. It is made by boiling barley grains in water, then (usually) straining to remove the grains, and possibly adding other ingredients, for example sugar.

Variations
Kykeon (Gr. κυκεών - kykeōn, from κυκάω, "to stir, to mix") was an ancient Greek drink made mainly of water, barley and naturally occurring substances. It was used at the climax of the Eleusinian Mysteries to break a sacred fast, but it was also a favourite drink of Greek peasants.
Agua de cebada, in Spanish speaking countries, is made with malted barley, sugar and lemon.
The British version is made by boiling washed pearl barley, straining, and adding fruit juice and sugar to taste, typically using lemon. The fruit rind may also be boiled with the barley. The Robinson's brand of the drink has been an official supplier to the Wimbledon tennis tournament and sponsored the event for over 80 years until 2022.
East Asian and Southeast Asian versions are typically not strained and may be consumed hot or cold, with or without lime. These kinds of barley water generally include the strained grain within the drink. Hot barley water is often served with a spoon and cold barley water with a straw so that the soft-boiled grains can be eaten.
Roasted barley tea is also a popular East Asian drink. The roasted barley is strained and removed before drinking.
It is also a popular drink among Punjabi peasants. It is called sattu in Punjabi.

Barley water has been used as a first baby food, before feeding with barley mush. It is also used as a home treatment that allegedly  cures cystitis.

Nutrition Facts

See also

 Coffee substitute
 List of barley-based drinks
 List of lemon dishes and drinks
 Rice water

References

Barley-based drinks
Non-alcoholic drinks
English drinks